Plainfield is a town in Otsego County, New York, United States. The population was 915 at the 2010 census.

The Town of Plainfield is located in the northwestern corner of Otsego County.

History 

The town was first settled circa 1793, near Plainfield Center.

Plainfield was established from part of the Town of Richfield in 1799.

Geography

The western town line is marked by the Unadilla River and is also the county line of Madison County and a small part of Oneida County.  The Unadilla River splits into the East  and West Branches at Unadilla Forks.

New York State Route 51 is a north–south highway in the eastern part of the town.

Demographics

As of the census of 2000, there were 986 people, 355 households, and 266 families residing in the town.  The population density was 33.5 people per square mile (12.9/km2).  There were 406 housing units at an average density of 13.8 per square mile (5.3/km2).  The racial makeup of the town was 98.48% White, 0.41% African American, 0.20% Asian, and 0.91% from two or more races. Hispanic or Latino of any race were 0.61% of the population.

There were 355 households, out of which 42.0% had children under the age of 18 living with them, 60.8% were married couples living together, 8.5% had a female householder with no husband present, and 24.8% were non-families. 20.8% of all households were made up of individuals, and 7.9% had someone living alone who was 65 years of age or older.  The average household size was 2.78 and the average family size was 3.14.

In the town, the population was spread out, with 31.3% under the age of 18, 5.0% from 18 to 24, 31.6% from 25 to 44, 21.2% from 45 to 64, and 10.9% who were 65 years of age or older.  The median age was 34 years. For every 100 females, there were 102.0 males.  For every 100 females age 18 and over, there were 102.7 males.

The median income for a household in the town was $34,500, and the median income for a family was $36,667. Males had a median income of $28,188 versus $21,181 for females. The per capita income for the town was $14,768.  About 9.0% of families and 12.4% of the population were below the poverty line, including 15.1% of those under age 18 and 12.8% of those age 65 or over.

Communities and locations in Plainfield 
Huntley Corners – A hamlet near the eastern town line on NY-51.
Leonardsville – A hamlet located at the Unadilla River, and mostly in Madison County.
Lloydsville – A hamlet near the Unadilla River.
Mount Markham – An elevation near Unadilla Forks.
Noahs Rump – An elevation in the southeastern part of Plainfield.
Plainfield Center – A hamlet in the northern part of Plainfield. It is the site of a Welsh Colony, which maintained a church for services in Welsh.
Spooners Corners – A location in the northeastern part of Plainfield at the intersection of NY-51 and Skaneateles Turnpike.  The name comes from early settler Ruggles Spooner.
Unadilla Forks – A hamlet in the northwestern section  of Plainfield, at the Unadilla River.
Welch Hill – An elevation located east of Noahs Rump.

References

External links
  Early map and brief history

Towns in Otsego County, New York